Odontotermes, commonly known as the fungus-growing termites, is a termite genus belonging to family Termitidae, which is native to the Old World. They are most destructive in wooden homes, and are agricultural pests in the tropics and subtropics of Africa and Asia. It is the most diverse termite genus in Africa, with 78 species recorded (as of 2002).

Nests
Their underground nests form a slight mound above ground, which may be covered in grass. Some species construct open chimneys or vent holes that descend into the mound. The fungal garden is enveloped by a thick layer of clay.

Castes
The queen is imprisoned in a clay cell in the midst of the fungal garden at the center of the hive. The African species have a single soldier cast, unlike the related genus Macrotermes.

Food
Their only food is the fungus  grown in the fungal garden at the center of the nest. The fungus is cultivated on a substrate of wood, bark, leaf litter, dry dung, and dead grass. These are plastered with cement where they are obtained, which facilitates diurnal foraging. Odontotermes species are major contributors to litter decomposition. The fungus Termitomyces reticulatus is found in association with O. badius and O. transvaalensis in Africa.

Species
Species include:
 Odontotermes assmuthi Holmgren, 1913 – South Asia
 Odontotermes badius (Haviland, 1898) – Africa
 Odontotermes ceylonicus (Wasmann, 1902) – South Asia
 Odontotermes escherichi Holmgren, 1911 – South Asia
 Odontotermes feae (Wasmann, 1896) – South Asia
 Odontotermes formosanus (Shiraki) – South Asia
 Odontotermes globicola (Wasmann, 1902) – South Asia
 Odontotermes horni (Wasmann, 1902) – South Asia
 Odontotermes koenigi (Desneux, 1906) – South Asia
 Odontotermes latericius (Haviland, 1898) – Africa
 Odontotermes obesus (Rambur) – South Asia
 Odontotermes preliminaris (Holmgren, 1911) – South Asia
 Odontotermes redemanni (Wasmann, 1893) – South Asia
 Odontotermes taprobanes (Walker, 1853) – South Asia
 Odontotermes transvaalensis (Sjöstedt, 1902) – Africa
 Odontotermes wallonensis Wasmann – South Asia

Gallery

References

Termite genera
Insects of Africa
Insects of Asia
Insect pests of millets